The Hivra Dam, also known as Hivara Dam or Hirawa Dam, is an earthfill dam on the Hivra River about  south of Pachora, Jalgaon district in state of Maharashtra in India. It is near the village of Khadakdeola. It is one of the main sources of water for Pachora and nearby villages. It also supplies water for irrigation in the area. The dam was completed in 1994.

Water usage
The project irrigates annually an area of 4,204 hectares in nearby villages. It also provides drinking water to Tarkheda, Jargaon and Pachora city.

See also
 Dams in Maharashtra
 List of reservoirs and dams in India

References

External links
Water storage & Dam information of Khandesh Region

Dams in Jalgaon district
Earth-filled dams
Dams completed in 1994
1994 establishments in Maharashtra